The Uncompahgre Plateau in western Colorado is a distinctive large uplift part of the Colorado Plateau.   is a Ute word that describes the water: "Dirty Water" or "Rocks that make Water Red".

Its boundaries are the San Miguel and Dolores Rivers to the west, the Colorado River to the north and the Gunnison and Uncompahgre Rivers on the eastern side.

Large canyons such as Big Red, Tabeguache, Spring Creek, Roubideau, Escalante, Big Dominquez, and Unaweep are separated by generally flat mesas. The Plateau watersheds include four tributaries of the Colorado River: Dolores River, Gunnison River, San Miguel River and Uncompahgre River.

The plateau is under the management of: 
 United States Forest Service Uncompahgre National Forest land    (37%)
 Bureau of Land Management    (37%)
 State of Colorado: Colorado State Land Board and Colorado Division of Wildlife land    (<1%)
 Private property, mostly in the Uncompahgre Valley, totals    (25%)

Geology 

Located in Southwest Colorado, the Uncompahgre Plateau is a high domed upland rising from the Colorado River. When it was formed, strong forces in the crust of the Earth forced the land to lift up.

See also

 Log Hill Mesa

References

External links
 USFS - Grand Mesa, Uncompahgre and Gunnison Natl Forests
 Colorado Division of Wildlife

Landforms of Colorado
Landforms of Delta County, Colorado
Landforms of Mesa County, Colorado
Landforms of Montrose County, Colorado
Landforms of Ouray County, Colorado
Landforms of San Miguel County, Colorado
Uncompahgre National Forest
Bureau of Land Management areas in Colorado
Plateaus of the United States